Groombridge is a village in England.

Groombridge may also refer to:

People
 Groombridge (Essex cricketer) (fl. 1793)
 Kate Groombridge (born 1980), British fashion model and actress
 Stephen Groombridge (1755–1832), British merchant and astronomer
 William Groombridge (disambiguation)

Other uses
 5657 Groombridge, an asteroid
 Groombridge 34, a binary system
 Groombridge 1618, a star